Club Sportiv Municipal Ceahlăul Piatra Neamț, commonly known as Ceahlăul Piatra Neamț or simply as Ceahlăul, is a Romanian football club based in Piatra Neamț, Neamț County, currently playing in the Liga III.

Originally established in 1919, the team's name stems from the not far off Ceahlău Massif. Nemțenii made their first appearance in the Romanian top division in the 1993–94 season.

The club plays its home matches in black and yellow kits at the 18,000-seater Stadionul Ceahlăul.

History

Early years (1919–1961)
Despite the fact that Piatra Neamț, a town of 85,055 inhabitants (2011 census), has never been historically a landmark of Moldavia being in the shadow of important cultural and economic centers such as: Iași, Galați or Bacău, it can boast with a major thing having the oldest football club from the region.

Ceahlăul Piatra Neamț was born on 20 October 1919, the club's setting-up meeting taking place in the amphitheater of the "Petru Rareș" High School. The steering committee at that time was made up of: M.Stamatiu – Honorary president, Gh. Gheorghiu – President, M.Stati – Vice-President, O.Leca – cashier, N.Stati – Secretary. The squad of the high school has been strengthened with soldiers of the 15th Infantry Regiment, returned from the World War I front: cpt. Țicleanu, lt. Tane Săvulescu, lt. Mareș, N.Secăreanu, lt. Cosara and Mavrosca. Until 1926 Ceahlăul had an important activity on regional level and in the championship of Moldavia, which they also won in 1926. In 1927 the players, most of them students went to college and for the club followed a period of decline, with a Divizia C presence in the 1937–38 season, but unsettled to the end due to lack of a proper financial situation. After years of inconsistency in terms of sports results, in 1939 World War II broke out, and football went on the second place, both in Piatra Neamț and in Romania.

After the end of the war Ceahlăul appeared again in 1947, this time with a new team which included following players: Vulovici, Bălănescu, Ciciuc (Popovici), Actis, Manoliu, Dăscălescu, Vasiliu, Georgescu, Mata, Butnaru and Chiper.

In 1949 Ceahlăul changed its name to Progresul Piatra Neamț, change that does not last long, Progresul being transformed in Avântul Piatra Neamț two years later. The 1950s were marked by a period of instability, with numerous changes within the team, from the name to its structure and players. This period was in fact the period of the birth of the modern Ceahlăul. Piatra Neamț had at that time three football clubs: Avântul (today known as Ceahlăul), Hârtia (paper mill team) and Celuloza (another team related with the paper mill), but all of them with oscillating results, generally marked by a presence somewhere at the level of the lower leagues. In 1956 Avântul, Hârtia and Celuloza merged and Recolta Piatra Neamț was born. As Recolta the team resisted only one season in the Divizia C finishing 11th out of 12. At the end of the season Recolta broke in two new teams: Avântul and Rapid. After a season of poor performances, the two teams realized that they can get better results together and merged again in 1958, this time as CS Piatra Neamț.

This last merge was a crucial moment, in fact the moment when professional football started his ascension in the city below Pietricica Mountain, when all the football forces in town came together. The board of directors was formed by: M.Weiss – President, dr. C.Andone, F.Cârlan, N.Pahoncea – Vice-Presidents. The first presence of the new team was in the 1958–59 Divizia C season, when it finished on the 3rd place. After another two seasons in the third league CS Piatra Neamț, promoted at the end of the 1960–61 season in the Divizia B, for the first time in the club's history. The squad was composed of coach Tiberiu Căpăţînă and the following players: Apopei, Albu, Bonciu, Bucșe, Croitoru, Ghegheșan, Hrencic, Kálmán, Lemnrău, Macri, Meder, Mihalache, Popa, Simion and Vintilă.

Ceahlăul, 30 years of second league (1961–1993)

In the summer of 1961, along with the promotion, the club changed its name again, back to Ceahlăul Piatra Neamț.

The club played three consecutive seasons at this level obtaining the following results: 1961–62 – 8th, 1962–63 – 10th and 1963–64 – 13th. Relegated to Divizia C, Ceahlăul it turned out to be a strong team and promoted back after only one season, ending the championship on the 1st place, with 4 points more than 2nd place, Textila Buhuși.

After this last promotion, Ceahlăul would remain for a long time at the level of the second league (with the exception of a new Divizia C season between 1979 and 1980), being a recognized and respected team at this level. In the following four seasons, the team ranked in the first or at worst, in the middle part of the table: 1965–66 – 7th, 1966–67 – 9th, 1967–68 – 5th and 1968–69 – 5th, in this last season, when they equaled the best performance up to that point, achieved just one year before, the team was coached by the well-known Petre Steinbach and the squad included players such as: Mitrofan, Argeșanu, Olteanu, Iencsi, Gheorghe, Zaharia,  Dragu, Seceleanu, Onica, Negustoru, Pătrașcu,  Meder, Ciocârlan or Niţă.

After his departure, the team had a fall and finished the 1969–70 season only in the 12th place, but enough to ensure its participation in the next edition of the championship. Followed a few seasons with mediocre rankings: 1970–71 – 8th, 1971–72 – 10th, 1972–73 – 13th and 1973–74 – 6th.

In the 1974–75 season the squad had a great course under the coach Al.Constantinescu, surpassing their best performance ever until then and finishing the championship on the 4th place, at only 1 point behind 3rd place (Gloria Buzău) and 4 points behind the 2nd place (Progresul Brăila). As well as at its last notable performance the team fell in the following seasons, occupying places in the middle to bottom area of the league table: 1975–76 – 13th, 1976–77 – 10th and 1977–78 – 12th.

In the summer of 1978 the club changed its name from Ceahlăul Piatra Neamț to Relon Ceahlăul Piatra Neamț and made one of the weakest seasons since its last promotion in 1965, finishing on the 15th place out of 18 and relegating to Divizia C, after 14 years in the second league. To note the more than tight league table of the first series in that season, between 4th place (FC Constanța) and 17th place (Victoria Tecuci) being a difference of just 6 points.

In the summer of 1979 Relon Ceahlăul Piatra Neamț changed its name again, back to the old one, Ceahlăul Piatra Neamț. Ceahlăul turned out to be again a much stronger team that the level of the third league and promoted back in the second league after only one season, finishing the 1st, with 7 points more than the 2nd place, occupied by Foresta Fălticeni.

Back in the Divizia B, Ceahlăul started with a new coach, Dumitru Dumitriu, but also started again its middle table evolutions: 1980–81 – 9th, 1981–82 – 10th and 1982–83 – 7th. In 1983 V.Copil was hired as the new coach and the team seemed to regain its second league glory after a 4th place occupied at the end of the 1983–84 season. After this result, which was the best in the history of the club, until then, Ceahlăul started to re-establish itself in the area that seemed to best characterize it, the middle of the ranking: 1984–85 – 11th, 1985–86 – 11th, 1986–87 – 8th, 1987–88 – 9th and 1988–89 – 11th. The midlife of the team in the second half of the 1980s was almost to turn into a new relegation at the end of the 1989–90 season, when "the Yellow and Blacks" finished only on the 14th place, just above the relegation line, at the same number of points (31) with Siretul Pașcani, first team located in the red zone. That season was a disconcerting one for the most of the teams in Romania, due to the 1989 Romanian Revolution and the fall of communism, facts that changed all the structures in the country.

If for many teams, representatives of the ruling communist forces, such as: Victoria București, Flacăra Moreni or Olt Scornicești, among others, the 1989 revolution was the beginning of the end, for Ceahlăul it was a real restart. From an already mediocre Divizia B team, "the Yellow and Blacks" started to battle with their old records, knocking more and more on the first league's door. First signs that Ceahlăul was no more a middle rank team was in the 1990–91 season when they finished 3rd at only 3 points from the second place. They would equalize their record again, a season later, another 3rd place, even if this time in the third series of the second league, at 3 points from the 2nd place (FC Baia Mare) and 10 points over Metrom Brașov.

In the summer of 1992 Ioan Sdrobiș, the one who is nicknamed "The Father", a coach who is well known for promoting young players in his teams, was hired as the new manager of the team below Pietricica Mountain. Also Gheorghe Ștefan has become the new president and the team was moved again in the first series, where FC Argeș, ASA Târgu Mureș, Gloria Buzău or Politehnica Iași were announced as redoubtable opponents in the fight for promotion. The fight was hard with the remark that in the fight appeared two teams closely related to the former political regime: Steaua Mizil (Steaua București satellite team at that moment) and Flacăra Moreni. During the winter break Sdrobiș left the team on the 1st place, after some disputes with Ștefan and signed with Dacia Unirea Brăila. He was replaced by Dinamo București and Fenerbahçe former player, Ion Nunweiller. In the end "the Yellow and Blacks" promoted to Divizia A, for the first time in the club's history, with 20 victories, 7 draws, 7 defeats, 54 goals scored and 24 conceded, 47 points, 6 over the next three teams: Steaua Mizil, FC Argeș and Flacăra Moreni. The team was made up of Ioan Sdrobiș (rounds 1–17) and Ion Nunweiller (rounds 18–34) as coaches and the following players: Anghelinei, Șoiman, Axinia I, Axinia II, Dinu, Alexa, Cozma, Gălan, Coșerariu, Enache, Bârcă, Ghioane, Grosu, Ivanov, Gigi Ion, Ionescu, Lefter, Ov. Marc, Mirea, Nichifor, Pantazi, Săvinoiu, Șoimaru, Urzică, Buliga, Oprea, Breniuc, Apachiței and Vrânceanu; the administrative leadership was ensured by: Gheorghe Ștefan, Gh.Chivorchian, Iulian Țocu, Liviu Tudor, Ioan Strătilă and Luigi Bodo.

The club was named for 6 months in 1993 as Ceahlăul Simpex, due to sponsorship reason.

Following these 30 years of Divizia B, along with the names already mentioned, important contributions have been related to the names of the following people: I.Iovicin, M.Crețu, Radu Toma, V.Rizea, Tr.Coman, N.Zaharia, T.Anghelini, Toader Șteț, M.Nedelcu, M.Radu and Fl.Hizo (coaches); C.Acatincăi, Gh.Ocneanu, D.Lospa and M.Contardo (presidents).

Golden Age of Ceahlăul (1993–2004)

The golden age of Ceahlăul was a period full of successes, beaten records, but also full of controversies, accusations and strange moments.

At the start of the 1993–94 Divizia A Ceahlăul was a well-known second league team, but a novice and a mysterious team for most combatants in the first division of the country. With the former player, Mircea Nedelcu, as the new coach and with its first golden generation on the pitch, Ceahlăul made a more than decent first season, installing where it felt the best also in the second league, on the 10th place, in the middle of the table. In the same component Ceahlăul would exceed all expectations and get the best performance in the history of the club, until then, a 5th place at the end of the 1994–95 season and the first qualifying in a European Cup.

1995–96 season is an important landmark in the history of the club from Neamț County, the club playing for the first time in a European Competitions, more exactly in the 1995 UEFA Intertoto Cup, where they have had remarkable results, winning a group composed of: FC Groningen, Beveren, Boby Brno and Etar Veliko Tarnovo. The results were as follows: 2–0 against Etar, 2–0 against Beveren, 2–0 against Brno and 0–0 against Groningen. In the round of 16 nemțenii encountered FC Metz of France, in front of which they inclined at Piatra Neamț, 0–2, goals scored by Jocelyn Blanchard and Franck Meyrignac. In the championship the team did not feel so good, probably accusing their first participation in European competitions and finished 15th, at 6 points from the relegation zone.

Under coach Florin Marin, "the Yellow and Blacks" had a revival in the 1996–97 season and end on the 6th place at only one point distance of the best performance equalizing. Followed two consecutive rankings in the 9th place, at the end of the 1997–98 and 1998–99 seasons, the team being trained by: Florin Marin, Mircea Nedelcu, Nicolae Manea or Viorel Hizo. In 1999 Ceahlăul was preparing for a new European Cup participation, the same UEFA Intertoto Cup, but the 1999 season. Ceahlăul made a new good run and eliminated two teams: Ekranas (2–0 on aggregate) and Jedinstvo Bihać (5–2 on aggregate). In the third round Ceahlăul would have had a historical two matches encounter, the games for which the entire Moldavia mobilized its forces, against the titrated Italian side Juventus. This double would remain an important landmark in the history of the club, the more so as Ceahlăul gave a good "answer", 1–1 at Piatra Neamț, scored Scânteie in the 28th minute and Alessio Tacchinardi in the 58th. In Italy, on the Dino Manuzzi Stadium from Cesena, they obtained an unexpected 0–0, but not enough to qualify. In the Divizia A Ceahlăul finished on the 4th place, best performance in its entire history, 1999–2000 season, being in fact the top period of the club. This golden generation, the second after the 1993 one, had Viorel Hizo as a coach and the following players: Eugen Anghel, Costel Câmpeanu, Radu Lefter – Angelo Alistar, Cristinel Atomulesei, Adrian Baldovin, Dumitru Botez, Codruț Domșa, Costel Enache, Leontin Grozavu, Constantin Ilie, Mihai Dan Ionescu, Ovidiu Marc, Mihai Nemțanu, Gheorghe Pantazi, Dănuț Perjă, Daniel Scînteie, Adrian Solomon, Tiberiu Șerban, Tudorel Șoimaru and Lavi Hrib.

In 2000 Ceahlăul entered again in the UEFA Intertoto Cup, becoming a traditional team of this competition. After a 9–4 on aggregate against Narva Trans from Estonia, in the first round, followed a 4–3 against Mallorca from Spain and Ceahlaul impressed again. In the third round nemțenii faced Austria Wien and after a 2–2 in Piatra Neamț, "the Yellow and Blacks" succumbed at Wien, on the Franz Horr Stadium, 0–3, goals scored by Wagner, Leitner and Dospel.

A proverb says: "What got up has to go down" and that's exactly what happened to Ceahlăul in the early 2000s. Frequent changes of coaches (11 in 4 years) from: Mircea Nedelcu to Florin Halagian and from Florin Marin to Marin Barbu, Viorel Hizo and Marius Lăcătuș and the partial change of generations led to poor results: 2000–01 – 11th, 2001–02 – 8th, 2003–04 – 14th. Ceahlăul relegated in 2004 after 11 years and 10 seasons in the first league, with Viorel Hizo in the first part and Marius Lăcătuș in the second part at the team's lead. But just before this disastrous season had a rage of pride and finished on the 5th place at the end of the 2002–03 and signing up for a new participation in the UEFA Intertoto Cup. This time the results were far away from the 1995, 1999 and 2000 campaigns, the team being eliminated from the first round by Tampere United of Finland.

Despite its notable performances Ceahlăul was also a very controversial team during this period, especially due to his president, Gheorghe Ștefan, the person who binds the highest performances of the football from Piatra Neamț. Ștefan, who is nicknamed "Pinalti", because he always demanded a penalty (with Moldavian accent) and always had to comment on the referee's evolution, had also been repeatedly accused of being together with Jean "Tata Jean" Pădureanu (Gloria Bistrița president) the father of the "Football Cooperative", a group of teams known for match fixing in the 1990s. Along with Ceahlăul were involved teams such as: Gloria Bistrița, FC Brașov, Steaua București or Dinamo București. Despite the fact that nothing has ever been officially investigated, statements of players, coaches, or even presidents testify for the strange matches from that period, as well as on-the-spot reports. The so-called "reciprocities" consisted in the fact that teams deliberately offered points between themselves to help with various purposes: winning the championship, qualifying in the European Cups or avoiding relegation. The enormous pressure put on the referees, match by match, brought to the city and Ceahlăul the nickname of "Kosovo", a war zone in the 1990s. Another memorable episode in the "Ștefan's era" at Piatra Neamț was in 2000 before the first match from the third round of UEFA Intertoto Cup, against Austria Wien, when he tried to offer prostitutes to the match referees, the club being suspended for a year from UEFA Competitions. "Pinalti" would defend himself by stating that the girls were just members of a folk ensemble. First signs of the "Football Cooperative" have been noticed since 1993 when it was suspected that Ceahlăul offered suitcases with money for the teams in the first series to pull hard against opponents or to let it easier in direct matches with them. Gelu Crăcană, one of the most passionate supporters of the team and a man who always found in its entourage stated in 2016: Mergeam cu genţi cu bani în majoritatea deplasărilor. Am mai cărat şi eu genţile, ţin minte că am purtat banii la mine când am mers la Autobuzul București ("We went with money bags in most of the trips. I've also carried these bags, I remember that I took the money with me when we went to Autobuzul București."). Also Iulian Țocu, one of the directors of the club in that period made some important revelations about how, many matches had been fixed in that season.

ABBA period (2004–2016)
In this period the team was known as an "ABBA team" (a nickname used in Romania for clubs that used to alternate the presences between the first and the second league).

After the relegation Florin Marin was hired as the new coach and despite the fact that the squad has kept a large part of the players Ceahlăul finished only on the 5th place, far away from the expectations considered at the beginning of the season. 18 points away from the promotion place, occupied by FC Vaslui and 22 from the first relegation place, occupied by FC Ghimbav. Marin Barbu replaced Florin Marin for the next season and the team below Pietricica Mountain promoted without major problems, 7 points over the second place, occupied by Forex Brașov and 8 points over FC Brașov.

In this period the club changed its logo, the old one with the black goat and the Ceahlău Massif on the background being replaced by the one with a bear, also the orange color, used as well in the past, became the first color, the traditional yellow and black kits is now used only in the away matches. Also in this period, the team has been nicknamed as Urșii carpatini ("The Carpathian Bears").

2006–07 Liga I season found a team far away from the form displayed in the late 1990s first league matches, with many managerial changes and with lack of inspiration Ceahlăul finished 15th, out of 18, and relegated after only one season spent in the top flight. But an unexpected help appeared in the summer of 2007, when Delta Tulcea, 2nd place in the first series of Liga II could not obtain the license for the 2007–08 Liga I season, the team from Piatra Neamț being accepted in its place. But it was a short-lived joy, under Viorel Hizo, the coach who obtained the best performances in the club's history, Ceahlăul relegated once again, after finishing on the same 15th place with 36 points, one less than Gloria Buzău, last team saved.

With Florin Marin, once again at the helm of the team, and with a new generation which included players like: Andrei Vițelaru, Alexandru Forminte, Alexandru Ichim, Daniel Barna, Andrei Țepeș, Vlad Achim, Eugeniu Cebotaru, Vlad Achim, Ionuț Bădescu or Cristinel Gafița, among others, Ceahlăul made an almost perfect season and promoted back to the Liga I with 69 points, result of 22 victories, 3 draws and 5 defeats, 52 goals scored and 17 conceded. The second place CSM Ploiești was at 2 points behind, but also promoted, the first place that doesn't promote was the 3rd one, occupied by Delta Tulcea.

The good evolutions from the second division did not materialize in the first division and "the Carpathian Bears" relegated once again, for the third time in the last 6 years, finishing 17th out of 18, with only 28 points obtained in 34 matches. During this season were also a lot of changes in the technical staff. The club started the season with Florin Marin, continued with Gheorghe Mulțescu and ended with ex-Benfica player Zoran Filipović.

After a strong route, Ceahlăul promoted once again at the end of the 2010–11 Liga II season, this time with Marin Barbu as a coach, at the second promotion with the team from Piatra Neamț, after the 2006 one. In the squad appeared names as Andrei Dumitraș, Andrei Marc or Sebastian Chitoșcă, the difference from the 2nd place (Concordia Chiajna) and the 3rd place (Săgeata Năvodari) being of 6 respectively 9 points.

Due to the good financial situation, the excellent training conditions and a talented generation of players completed with some experienced ones, but also due to the contribution of a new wave of talented coaches such as: Costel Enache, Vasile Miriuță or Constantin Ilie, Ceahlăul maintained for four consecutive years in the first league, with the following results: 2011–12 – 11th, 2012–13 – 14th, 2013–14 – 9th and 2014–15 – 18th.

The big problems started for Ceahlăul in 2014 when the club began to be suffocated by the historical debts. In the same year Ștefan, who was also the mayor of Piatra Neamț between 2004 and 2014 has begun to have legal problems, being even arrested in the "Microsoft Case". Without municipality's help or involvement of "Pinalti" Ceahlăul has been seen in a situation without exit, in December 2014 55% of the club's shares were sold to the Italian businessman Angelo Massone. Massone has brought many players from the Italian or Spanish lower leagues and hired coaches such as: Zé Maria or Vanja Radinović, but with no effect for "the Carpathian Bears".

Returned to the Liga II, without money from TV rights, without the help of the municipality and with an owner who did not seem to invest anything in the team, with the conditions being really bad, so bad that the media even called the club as: "Massone's Camp". With a drifting financial situation, unpaid players, six coaches changed in a season and the same policy of transfers from the Italian and Spanish lower leagues Ceahlăul ended the regular season only on the 12th place avoiding the direct relegation in the last minute. However Ceahlăul withdrew from the championship with a few rounds before the end of the play-out round and was relegated to the county leagues.

The financial problems could not be managed and the club entered in dissolution in the spring of 2016.

A new beginning (2016–present)
On 22 July 2016 was announced in the media that the club will be re-founded as CSM Ceahlăul Piatra Neamț, the founders of the new entity being: Mihai Bătrânu and Cătălin Roca, owners of Moldocor and Ro Com Central Companies, two old sponsors of the team. Also RIFIL Company, a traditional sponsor of the team, represented by Luigi Bodo and Ioan Strătilă have shown their support for the new entity. On 17 August 2016 the new entity has acquired legal personality.

The logo of the club was also changed, the black goat and Ceahlău Massif returning to the foreground, in a restyled form, also the club colors were changed to the original ones, yellow and black. The team was enrolled in the Liga V and the experienced Toader Șteț was hired as the new coach. The squad was formed from players who grew up at Ceahlăul Football Academy and after only one season the team below Pietricica Mountain promoted to Liga IV, having a destructive ranking: 1st place, 16 victories, 0 draws, 0 defeats, 136 goals scored and only 5 conceded, 48 points, with 13 more than the 2nd place (Olimpia Grințieș).

In the 2017–18 Liga IV season, nemțenii started with the same Toader Șteț as a coach and with players that also played for the team in the second league, or even in the first league, such as: Teodor Cîmpianu, Alexandru Smău, Marius Rusu, Andrei Apostol, Cristian Copoț-Barb or Andrei Mateiciuc, among others. As expected, the team did not face too many problems and entered in the winter break from the 1st place, with victories on the line. During the winter break Toader Șteț was replaced by Gabriel Rădulescu.

Youth program
Youth academy of Ceahlăul Piatra Neamț is the biggest and most successful in Moldavia, over time from this academy going into big football players such as: Vasile Avădanei, Florin Axinia, Mihai Bordeianu, Lucian Burdujan, Robert Căruță, Gelu Chertic, Lidi Chertic Sebastian Chitoșcă, Lucian Covrig, Marian Drăghiceanu, Costel Enache, Alexandru Forminte, Alexandru Ichim, Constantin Ilie, Mihai Dan Ionescu, Andrei Marc, Florin Nohai, Doru Popadiuc, Gabriel Rădulescu, Adrian Solomon, Tudor Șoimaru, Andrei Țepeș or Andrei Vițelaru. Among the most important talent finders in Ceahlăul Football Academy were professors Radu Toma and Mihai Radu.

Grounds

The club plays its home matches on Stadionul Ceahlăul from Piatra Neamț. Originally known as Borzoghean and still nicknamed in this mode by the supporters, the stadium had a capacity of 12,000 seats and the shape of letter "U". Between 2006 and 2007 the stadium was renovated, extended (a new End Sector was built), orange seats were mounted instead of the old yellow and black ones and a floodlight installation was also installed. The capacity reached 18,000 seats after other renovations which took place in the early 2010s. Stadionul Ceahlăul is a 3 star ranked in the UEFA stadium categories.

Support
Ceahlăul has many supporters in Piatra Neamț and especially in Neamț County. They are not exactly the ultras type, but despite this fact some ultras groups were formed over time such as: Brigate Ultras 2009 and Tinerii Nemțeni. In 2010 "the Yellow and Blacks" supporters surprised everyone by the fact that they had the first and only ultras leader in Romania, who is a woman, Geanina Ciocoiu.

Rivalries
Ceahlăul does not have important rivalries, most of them being regional, the so-called Derby-urile Moldovei (Moldavia Derbies) against teams such as: FCM Bacău, FC Politehnica Iași or Oțelul Galați and most recently against FC Vaslui, CSM Politehnica Iași or FC Botoșani.

Trivia
In 2006, Gelu Crăcană, a fan of Ceahlăul Piatra Neamț created a 420 square meters (500 including the sleeves) Ceahlăul Piatra Neamț jersey shirt with Florin Axinia's name on it which entered the Guinness World Records Hall of fame.

Honours

Domestic

Leagues
Liga II
Winners (4): 1992–93, 2005–06, 2008–09, 2010–11
Liga III
Winners (3): 1960–61, 1964–65, 1979–80
Liga IV – Neamț County
Winners (1): 2017–18
Liga V – Neamț County
Winners (1): 2016–17

Other leagues
Moldavia Championship
Winners (1): 1926

Cups
Cupa României – Neamț County
Winners (1): 2017–18

Other performances 
Appearances in Liga I: 18
Best finish in Liga I: 4th place in the 1999–2000
Place 22 of 98 teams in the Liga I All-time table

European record

European cups all-time statistics

Players

First team squad

Out on loan

Club Officials

Board of directors

Current technical staff

League history

Notable former players
The footballers enlisted below have had international cap(s) for their respective countries at junior and/or senior level and/or more than 100 caps for CSM Ceahlăul Piatra Neamț.

Romania
  Vlad Achim
  Angelo Alistar
  Florin Axinia
  Gheorghe Axinia
  Vasile Avădanei
  Ionuț Bădescu
  Daniel Barna
  Dumitru Botez
  Lucian Burdujan
  Sebastian Chitoșcă
  Marian Constantinescu
  Lucian Covrig
  Codruț Domșa
  Cristian Dulca
  Andrei Dumitraș
  Costel Enache
  Alexandru Forminte
  Dorin Goian
  Lucian Goian
  Leontin Grozavu

Armenia
  Arman Karamyan

Bosnia and Herzegovina
  Bojan Golubović
  Duško Stajić

Lithuania
  Vaidas Slavickas

Macedonia
  Krste Velkoski

Moldova
  Nicolae Calancea
  Eugeniu Cebotaru
  Viorel Frunză
  Alexandru Golban

DR Congo
  Rodrigue Dikaba

Ghana
  Hamza Mohammed

Guinea-Bissau
  Bruno Fernandes

Peru
  Piero Saldívar

Rwanda
  Jimmy Mulisa

Tunisia
  Haykel Guemamdia

Romania
  Alexandru Ichim
  Adrian Iencsi
  Mihai Dan Ionescu
  Constantin Ilie
  Radu Lefter
  Andrei Marc
  Ovidiu Marc
  Sebastian Moga
  Mihai Nemțanu
  Gheorghe Nițu
  Florin Nohai
  Dănuț Perjă
  Doru Popadiuc
  Marian Purică
  Ion Sburlea
  Tiberiu Șerban
  Vasile Șoiman
  Adrian Solomon
  Costel Solomon
  Andrei Vițelaru

Notable former managers

 Marin Barbu
 Ştefan Coidum
 Dumitru Dumitriu
 Zoran Filipović
 Florin Halagian
 Viorel Hizo
 Florin Marin
 Vasile Miriuță
 Gheorghe Mulțescu
 Mircea Nedelcu
 Ion Nunweiller
 Ioan Sdrobiş
 Petre Steinbach

References

External links

 Official Website

 
Football clubs in Neamț County
Piatra Neamț
Association football clubs established in 1919
Liga I clubs
Liga II clubs
Liga III clubs
Liga IV clubs
1919 establishments in Romania